Saline is a village and parish in Fife, Scotland, situated  to the north-west of Dunfermline. It lies in an elevated position on the western slopes of the Cleish Hills.

At the 2001 Census the population was 1188, a decline from the 1235 recorded in the 1991 Census. The village has a primary school, a parish church and a golf course. The glen runs from the bottom of the main street through to neighbouring Steelend.

The civil parish has a population of 1,762 (in 2011) and an area of 8,757 acres.

The village is dominated to the east-north-east by Saline Hill, 359 meters OD, with a hill fort on the eastern summit. The smaller hill to the south of east at Bandrum has a standing stone on the peak.

History
A Pre-Reformation church was under control of Dunkeld Cathedral.

Formerly a weaving centre, Saline was not much redeveloped during the 19th and 20th centuries as the expansion of industrial mining in west Fife largely passed it by. As a result, Saline contains a sizable number of listed buildings, mostly 18th century weavers' cottages.

The parish church was designed by William Stark in 1808 and remodelled in 1905 by Glasgow architect Peter MacGregor Chalmers. Following the Disruption of 1843 a Free Church was built on Bridge Street by Lewis Mercer.

Famous Residents
Thomas Bonnar (1821-1862) the Edinburgh architect was born here.

References

External links

 Gazetteer for Scotland entry
 Saline Primary School website
 About Saline at Fife Council

Villages in Fife
Parishes in Fife